Michael Anthony Robbins (14 November 1930 – 11 December 1992) was an English actor and comedian best known for his role as Arthur Rudge in the TV sitcom and film versions of On the Buses (1969–73).

Career
Michael Robbins was born in Croydon, Surrey, to Percival W. Robbins (1899–1956) and Bertha May née Sindall (1900–1997), who outlived him. From 1939 to 1944 Robbins was a pupil at St Michael's College, a Catholic school for boys, in Hitchin, Hertfordshire. He then went on to work as a bank clerk and later became an actor after appearing in amateur dramatic performances also in Hitchin, where he and his family lived at the time.

Robbins made his television debut as the cockney soldier in Roll-on Bloomin' Death. Primarily a comedy actor, he is best remembered for the role of Arthur Rudge, the persistently sarcastic husband of Olive (Anna Karen), in the popular sitcom On the Buses (1969–73). Robbins and Karen provided the secondary comic storyline to Reg Varney's comedy capers at the bus depot. Robbins appeared in the first six series but left before what would become the final season because he wanted to return to theatre work. He appeared in the series film spin-offs, On the Buses, Mutiny on the Buses, and Holiday on the Buses (which came out after he had left the series in 1973).

His other comedy credits include non-recurring roles in Man About the House, Oh Brother!, The Good Life, One Foot in the Grave, The New Statesman, George and Mildred, Hi-de-Hi! and You Rang, M'Lord?. He appeared as a rather humorously portrayed police sergeant in the TV adaptation of Brendon Chase.

As well as these comic roles, he assumed various straight roles in some of the major British television shows of the 1960s and 1970s, including that of the hard-drinking old sea dog Harry Baxter in The Saint episode The People Importers. He made appearances in Minder, The Sweeney, Z-Cars, Return of the Saint, Murder Most English, Rumpole Of The Bailey, The Avengers, Dixon of Dock Green, The Bill and the 1982 Doctor Who story "The Visitation".

Robbins' film credits included The Whisperers, Up The Junction, Till Death Us Do Part, The Looking Glass War, Zeppelin,  The Great Muppet Caper and Blake Edwards' films The Pink Panther Strikes Again and Victor/Victoria. He also had an extensive career as a radio actor, including a role in the soap opera Waggoners' Walk.

In the mid-1970s he directed a film, How Are You?

He appeared as a councillor in EastEnders in June 1989.

Personal life
Robbins was married to actress Hal Dyer (1935–2011), from 1960 until his death from prostate cancer in 1992 aged 62. Dyer died in 2011 from a brain haemorrhage.

Robbins was an indefatigable worker for charity. He was active in the Grand Order of Water Rats (being elected "Rat of the Year" in 1978) and the Catholic Stage Guild. In 1987 he received the Pro Ecclesia et Pontifice medal, a papal award, for his services. In one of his last television appearances, in A Little Bit of Heaven, he recalled his childhood visits to Norfolk and spoke of his faith and love of the Shrine of Our Lady at Walsingham.

Partial filmography

Film

 Lunch Hour (1961) – Harris
 A Prize of Arms (1962) – Orford
 What a Crazy World (1963) – Percy
 Act of Murder (1964) – Van Driver
 The Bargee (1964) – Bargee (uncredited)
 Rattle of a Simple Man (1964) – George – Organiser
 Gideon's Way (1965) – George
 The Whisperers (1967) – Mr. Noonan
 Up the Junction (1968) – Figgins
 Till Death Us Do Part (1968) – Pub Landlord (Fred)
 Crossplot (1969) – Garage attendant
 The Looking Glass War (1970) – Truck Driver
 All the Way Up (1970) – Taxi Driver
 Zeppelin (1971) – Cockney Sergeant
 Villain (1971) – Barzun
 On the Buses (1971) – Arthur Rudge, Stan's brother-in-law
 Mutiny on the Buses (1972) – Arthur Rudge, Stan's brother-in-law
 That's Your Funeral (1972) – 2nd Funeral Director
 No Sex Please, We're British (1973) – Car Driver
 Holiday on the Buses (1973) – Arthur Rudge, Stan's brother-in-law
 Man About the House (1974) – Second Doorman
 The Pink Panther Strikes Again (1976) – Ainsley Jarvis
 The Saint and the Brave Goose (1979) – Beeky
 The Great Muppet Caper (1981) – Security Guard
 Victor/Victoria (1982) – Manager of Victoria's Hotel
 Lost In London (1985) – Bill
 Just Ask for Diamond (1988) – The Fat Man

Television
 A Chance of Thunder (1961) – Mills
 Deadline Midnight (1961) – First Man
 Edgar Wallace Mysteries Dead Man's Chest (1965) – Sergeant Harris
 On the Buses (1969–1972) – Arthur Rudge
 The Sweeney, "Big Brother" (1974) – Kevin Lee
 The Good Life  "Whose Fleas Are These?" (1976) – Mr Bulstrode
 The Fuzz (1977) – Det. Sgt. Sidney Marble
 George and Mildred (1979) – Alf
 Minder (1980) – Jack McQueen
 Doctor Who (1982) – Richard Mace
 Fairly Secret Army (1984) – Sgt. Major Throttle
  Dempsey and Makepeace (1986) –
 Rumpole of the Bailey (1987) – Cyril Timson
 Strong Poison (1987) – Bill Rumm
 Hi-de-Hi! (1988) – Roger
 EastEnders (1989) – Councillor
 The New Statesman (let them eat cake) series 3 (1991)
 The Winjin' Pom (1991) – The Winjin' Pom
 One Foot in the Grave – "The Man in the Long Black Coat" (1991) – Mr Killick
 "The Bill" (1991) – Tobin
 In Sickness and in Health (1992) – Rail worker

References

Further reading
 The Daily Telegraph Third Book of Obituaries (Entertainers) – Edited by Hugh Massingberd

External links
 

1930 births
1992 deaths
Deaths from cancer in England
English male film actors
English male television actors
20th-century English male actors
People from Hitchin